Bertie Green may refer to:

Bertie Green Travel Awards
Bertie Green, character in Captain Fury

See also
Bert Green (disambiguation)
Albert Green (disambiguation)
Robert Green (disambiguation)
Herbert Green (disambiguation)
Hubert Green (1946–2018), golfer